The middle finger, long finger, second finger, third finger, toll finger or tall man is the third digit of the human hand, located between the index finger and the ring finger.  It is typically the longest digit. In anatomy, it is also called the third finger, digitus medius, digitus tertius or digitus III.

In Western countries, extending the middle finger (either by itself, or along with the index finger in the United Kingdom: see V sign) is an offensive and obscene gesture, widely recognized as a form of insult, due to its resemblance of an erect penis, It is known, colloquially, as "flipping the bird", "flipping (someone) off", or "giving (someone) the finger". 

The middle finger is often used for finger snapping together with the thumb.

References

Fingers
Hand gestures